Rhopaloceracris is a genus of Asian grasshoppers in the family Acrididae, subfamily Coptacrinae.

Species
The Orthoptera Species File lists:
 Rhopaloceracris chapaensis Tinkham, 1940 - type species from "Mount Chapa", northern Vietnam
 Rhopaloceracris chinensis Tinkham, 1940 - south-east China

References

External links

Coptacrinae
Acrididae genera
Orthoptera of Asia